Fulton is a city in Bourbon County, Kansas, United States.  As of the 2020 census, the population of the city was 165.

History
Fulton was originally known as Osaga, and under the latter name was founded in 1869. It was renamed to Fulton in 1878, after the city of Fulton, Illinois.

A post office was first established under the name Osaga in 1869.

Geography
Fulton is located at  (38.009828, -94.719358), along the Little Osage River.

Demographics

2010 census
As of the census of 2010, there were 163 people, 63 households, and 45 families residing in the city. The racial makeup of the city was 90.2% White, 0.6% African American, 3.7% Native American, 1.2% from other races, and 4.3% from two or more races. Hispanic or Latino of any race were 5.5% of the population.

There were 63 households, of which 34.9% had children under the age of 18 living with them, 49.2% were married couples living together, 9.5% had a female householder with no husband present, 12.7% had a male householder with no wife present, and 28.6% were non-families. 23.8% of all households were made up of individuals, and 9.5% had someone living alone who was 65 years of age or older. The average household size was 2.59 and the average family size was 3.07.

The median age in the city was 40.5 years. 22.7% of residents were under the age of 18; 12.8% were between the ages of 18 and 24; 19% were from 25 to 44; 31.2% were from 45 to 64; and 14.1% were 65 years of age or older. The gender makeup of the city was 50.9% male and 49.1% female.

2000 census
As of the census of 2000, there were 184 people, 71 households, and 47 families residing in the city. The racial makeup of the city was 94.57% White, 3.26% Native American, 0.54% Asian, and 1.63% from two or more races. Hispanic or Latino of any race were 0.54% of the population.

There were 71 households, out of which 32.4% had children under the age of 18 living with them, 52.1% were married couples living together, 8.5% had a female householder with no husband present, and 32.4% were non-families. 28.2% of all households were made up of individuals, and 14.1% had someone living alone who was 65 years of age or older. The average household size was 2.59 and the average family size was 3.08.

In the city, the population was spread out, with 28.8% under the age of 18, 8.2% from 18 to 24, 27.7% from 25 to 44, 22.8% from 45 to 64, and 12.5% who were 65 years of age or older. The median age was 38 years. For every 100 females, there were 104.4 males. For every 100 females age 18 and over, there were 92.6 males.

The median income for a household in the city was $26,094, and the median income for a family was $41,071. Males had a median income of $29,375 versus $25,000 for females. The per capita income for the city was $15,070. About 14.6% of families and 11.8% of the population were below the poverty line, including none of those under the age of eighteen and 16.7% of those 65 or over.

Education
The community is served by Fort Scott USD 234 public school district.  It previously operated Fulton High School before it closed.

References

Further reading

External links

 Fulton - Directory of Public Officials
 Fulton city map, KDOT

Cities in Kansas
Cities in Bourbon County, Kansas
1869 establishments in Kansas
Populated places established in 1869